Romesh Bhandari (29 March 1928 – 7 September 2013) was an Indian Foreign Secretary, former Lieutenant Governor of Delhi, Andaman and Nicobar Islands, and former governor of Tripura, Goa and Uttar Pradesh.

Career
Bhandari was born in Lahore, present day Pakistan, to Amar Nath Bhandari, a Punjab High Court Judge who was part of bench which decided Gandhi Assassination case.

He joined the Indian Foreign Service (IFS) in 1950 as the Vice-Consul at the consulate in New York. He was minister in the Indian Embassy at Moscow from 1970 to 1971. He was the ambassador to Thailand and Permanent Representative to UN Economic Commission for Asia and the Far East from 1971 to 1974 and ambassador to Iraq from 1974 to 1976. He then returned to the Ministry of External Affairs as Additional Secretary from February 1977 to July 1979. He was promoted as Secretary on 1 August 1979 and was appointed Foreign Secretary on 1 February 1985. He retired from service on 31 March 1986.

He has the unique distinction of bringing back to India, hijackers of an Indian Airlines Aircraft from Dubai in 1984.

He was the Lieutenant Governor of Delhi from 4 August 1988 to December 1989 and of Andaman and Nicobar islands from December 1989 to 24 February 1990. 
He was the governor of Tripura from 15 August 1993 to 15 June 1995, governor of Goa from 16 June 1995 to 18 July 1996 and governor of Uttar Pradesh from 19 July 1996 to 17 March 1998.

Bhandari died on the night of 7 September 2013 after a prolonged illness.

References

Indian Foreign Secretaries
People from Lahore
1928 births
2013 deaths
Governors of Tripura
Governors of Goa
Governors of Uttar Pradesh
Lieutenant Governors of Delhi
Lieutenant governors of the Andaman and Nicobar Islands
Ambassadors of India to Iraq
Ambassadors of India to Thailand
Indian Foreign Service officers